Pike County Schools is a public school district located in Pike County, Kentucky. The district has 10,457 students (as of 2008) attending 25 schools, making it the eighth largest school district in Kentucky. It serves the entire county except for the city of Pikeville, which has a separate district of its own. Although some of the schools operated by the Pike County district have a Pikeville mailing address, none of them are within the Pikeville city limits.

Board of education

The five members of the Pike County Board of Education are elected by general election to four-year terms. Each board member is responsible for an area of Pike County and the schools contained therein. The current board members are: Chairman Justin Maynard, Vice Chairman Kenneth "C.B." Biliter, Ireland "Heavy" Blankenship, and Nee Jackson.  The District 3 board seat was vacated in October 2015 by Frank Ratliff.  The seat has not yet been filled. Reed Adkins currently serves as superintendent.

List of schools

References

Education in Pike County, Kentucky
School districts in Kentucky